Ignacio Escamilla (born 21 September 1967, Mexico City) is a Mexican former Olympic freestyle swimmer. He competed at the 1988 Summer Olympics in Seoul, South Korea, (aged 21 years, 3 days) as part of the Mexico swimming team of seven men and three women competing in 21 sporting events.

References

1967 births
Living people
Mexican male swimmers
Mexican male freestyle swimmers
Swimmers at the 1988 Summer Olympics
Olympic swimmers of Mexico
Competitors at the 1990 Central American and Caribbean Games
Central American and Caribbean Games gold medalists for Mexico
Place of birth missing (living people)
Central American and Caribbean Games medalists in swimming
20th-century Mexican people
21st-century Mexican people